Estádio Municipal Eng. Manuel Branco Teixeira is a multi-use stadium in Chaves, Portugal. It is currently used mostly for football matches and is the home stadium of GD Chaves. The stadium is able to hold 12,000 people. The stadium normally holds the national teams' youth games and also some U21 games and also the senior team but rarely.  Cristiano Ronaldo made his debut for the Portugal national team against Kazakhstan in 2003, at this stadium.

Portugal national football team
The following national team matches were held in the stadium.

References

Municipal Chaves
Sport in Chaves, Portugal
Municipal Stadium
Municipal Stadium
Sports venues completed in 1949